ICGV Óðinn is a decommissioned offshore patrol vessel formerly operated by the Icelandic Coast Guard. She is the oldest ship in the coastguard's fleet, and it is believed that her Burmeister & Wain engines are the only such engines that are still serviceable in the world today. Since her withdrawal from active duty, she has served as a floating exhibit at the Reykjavík Maritime Museum in Reykjavík Harbour. The ship is still maintained, and operative as of June 2022.

Service
On 23 October 1963, Óðinn went to the aid of the British trawler Northern Spray, which had run aground off the coast of Iceland, and with the trawler James Barrie, rescued Northern Sprays crew and attempted unsuccessfully to refloat the stranded trawler.

The Cod Wars
On 30 April 1976, during the cod wars, she was rammed in the stern by the British sidewinder trawler Arctic Corsair, after Óðinn had made three attempts to cut the trawl warps. In 2017, with both vessels museum ships, their bells were exchanged as a gesture of cooperation.

Museum ship
The ship was donated to the Hollvinasamtök Óðins in 2008 and it was put on display at the Reykjavík Maritime Museum. In 2014, work on restoring the ship to operational status began and in 2020, the ship sailed from Reykjavík harbour for the first time in more than a decade during an engine test. In May 2022, Óðinn received an official certificate of seaworthiness from the Icelandic Transport Authority. On 11 June 2022, Óðinn sailed with Guðni Th. Jóhannesson, the President of Iceland, and Suzuki Ryotaro, the Japanese ambassador to Iceland, from Reykjavík to Grindavík for the official celebration of the Icelandic Fishermen's day.

In film 
ICGV Óðinn was used as scenery in the film Flags of Our Fathers, when it was filmed in Iceland the summer of 2005. She rescued one of the landing boats used in the film, as it was about to be thrown into a cliff.

Previous Óðinns 

The first ICGV Óðinn was the second Icelandic Coast Guard vessel that was commissioned and the first purposely built as a patrol ship. She was built in Denmark in 1925 and arrived in Iceland on 23 June 1926. A steel ship with a displacement of 512 tonnes, she was armed with two 57mm cannon. As a result of severe financial mismanagement of the Icelandic Government she was sold cheaply to Sweden in 1936.
The second ICGV Óðinn was built on Akureyri in 1938. She was only 85 tonnes and made of oak. When the current Óðinn was commissioned she was renamed Gautur which is one of Óðinn's pseudonyms. She was decommissioned in 1964.

References

External links 

http://www.lhg.is (in Icelandic)

Patrol vessels of Iceland
Ships built in Aalborg
1959 ships
Museum ships in Iceland